Stronger Than Regulations (German: Stärker als Paragraphen) is a 1936 German mystery film directed by Jürgen von Alten and starring Paul Hartmann, Karl Hellmer and Manja Behrens. It was shot at the Grunewald Studios in Berlin. The film's sets were designed by the art directors Otto Guelstorff and Hans Minzloff.

Cast
 Paul Hartmann as Lawyer Dr. Birk 
 Karl Hellmer as Theodor Hubricht - Geldvermittler 
 Manja Behrens as Renate - seine Nichte 
 Maria Krahn as Christine - Wirtschafterin bei Hubricht 
 Aribert Wäscher as Bankier Lörik 
 Hilde von Stolz as Frau Lörik 
 Ursula Herking as Tochter des Portiers 
 Walter Franck as Prosecutor
 Karel Stepanek as Robert Wendland 
 F.W. Schröder-Schrom as Dr. Krüger 
 Walter Werner as Judge
 Carl Auen as Prosecutor
 Fredy Barten as Diener 
 Jac Diehl
 Fritz Draeger as Gerichtsreporter 
 Kurt Felden
 Gerdi Gerdt as Zofe 
 Oskar Höcker
 Ellen-Ruth Knapp-Güttingen as Freundin 
 Viggo Larsen
 Alfred Peters as Beigeordneter 
 Fredy Rolf
 Just Scheu as Defense lawyer
 Wera Schultz as Krankenschwester 
 Wolfgang Staudte as Freund der Portierstochter 
 Jörn Valery
 Michael von Newlinsky as Gast 
 Eduard Wenck

References

Bibliography 
 Klaus, Ulrich J. Deutsche Tonfilme: Jahrgang 1936. Klaus-Archiv, 1988.
 Waldman, Harry. Nazi Films in America, 1933–1942. McFarland, 2008.

External links 
 

1936 films
Films of Nazi Germany
German mystery films
1936 mystery films
1930s German-language films
Films directed by Jürgen von Alten
German black-and-white films
1930s German films